Finkbeiner is a surname. Notable people with the surname include:

Bill Finkbeiner (born 1969), American politician
Carty Finkbeiner (born 1939), American politician
Kristin Rowe-Finkbeiner (born 1969), American author, speaker and radio host
Lloyd Finkbeiner (1920–1998), Canadian ice hockey player
Lilly Finkbeiner (born 2011), Young American artist and equestrian